"Rough" (: "Run through time") is a song recorded by South Korean girl group GFriend for their third extended play, Snowflake (2016). The song was released by Source Music on January 25, 2016, as the EP title track.

The song was ranked at number 3 on the year-end Gaon Digital Chart for 2016 and was the best selling song of the year in South Korea with 1,903,126 downloads sold. GFriend became the first and only artist to achieve a double-consecutive grandslam with one single song on music programs, with their all-time hit song Rough.

Composition 
The song was written and produced by Iggy and Youngbae, who previously produced the first two singles of the group.

Release and promotion
GFriend's third EP was much-anticipated after the group won Rookie of the Year at the Golden Disk Awards and Best New Female Artist at the MelOn Music Awards for their hit singles "Glass Bead" and "Me Gustas Tu". The album's title, Snowflake, and track list were revealed on January 14, 2016. It was released on January 25, in both CD and digital formats. The lead single, "Rough",  is the final song in the group's "school series" and represents the end of a school year. They maintained their "powerful-innocent" concept, wearing school uniforms and showcasing "perfectly synchronized fierce and powerful" dance choreography. The accompanying music video for "Rough" was inspired by the anime film The Girl Who Leapt Through Time. It was produced by Zanybros and directed by Hong Won-ki.

Hours after the album's release, the group held a showcase at AX Korea in Gwangjin-gu, Seoul, which was broadcast live via Naver's V app. They performed songs from the album for the first time at the showcase. The group then promoted the album with performances of "Rough" on various music shows, starting with SBS MTV's The Show on January 26. In their second week of promotion, the song won first place on every music show with a chart system. By February 28, "Rough" had won a total of 15 music show trophies, including "triple crowns" on M! Countdown, Music Bank, Show Champion, and Inkigayo. With these wins, GFriend is in second place for number of wins by a girl group for a single song, behind Apink's 17 wins for "Luv".

Reception 
The song made Billboard's 20 Best K-Pop Songs of 2016 list at number 13, stating that the group "solidified their place as one of the top new girl groups", adding that they "perfected their formula of synthesizer-driven pop with dramatic violin lines" with a "more impassioned vocal delivery than we heard from the six beauties".

Chart performance 
The song debuted at number 2 on the Gaon Digital Chart, on the chart issue dated January 24–30, 2016, with 298,228 downloads sold and 4,598,171 streams. In its second week, the song stayed at number 2 and topped the chart the following week, marking the group's first number one single in South Korea. The song topped the chart for two consecutive weeks and spent a total of seven weeks within the top 10.

The song placed at number 14 on the chart for the month of January 2016, with 325,098 downloads sold and 5,287,188 streams. In February, the song topped the monthly chart with 454,065 downloads sold and 22,466,115 streams - topping the Streaming Chart -.

The song also made the year-end chart as the third best selling song of the 2016, with 1,903,126 downloads sold - topping the year-end Download Chart - and 98,910,973 streams.

The song surpassed 100 million streams in January 2017 and 2,500,000 downloads in June 2018.

Music video 
A music video for the song was released on January 25, 2016. The video features the group as high school students, As of 2021 the video earned 71 million views in YouTube.

Accolades

Charts

Weekly charts

Year-end charts

Sales

References 

2016 songs
2016 singles
GFriend songs
Korean-language songs
Kakao M singles
Hybe Corporation singles